Apolo Kivebulaya (c. 1864 - 30 May 1933) was a Ugandan Anglican priest and evangelist. He is sometimes referred to as the "apostle to the pygmies" for his work among the Bambuti people of the Ituri forest in eastern Congo. Apolo is considered the principal pioneer of the Anglican church in the Belgian Congo.

Biography 
He was born, along with a twin brother, in 1864 in Kiwanda, Uganda. His parents originally named him Waswa Munubi. Waswa grew up the son of peasants who apprenticed him to a witch doctor, but when he discovered the man tricking people out of their possessions, he left him to learn about Islam, which had been recently brought to the court of the Kabaka of Buganda, Muteesa, by Arab traders.

When Waswa turned 13, Henry Morton Stanley, who had discovered David Livingstone in 1872, paid a visit to Mutesa's court and persuaded the chief to begin "reading" in the Christian religion. The chief was probably more impressed with Stanley's guns than with his Bible, for Mutesa had already parted ways with the Arabs and now needed protection. But the chief's welcome opened the door for his people to embrace Christianity.

Stanley's expedition opened the way for other missionaries too, notably Alexander Murdoch Mackay, who arrived in 1878. Waswa credits MacKay with planting seeds of belief in his life. "When I looked at the European," he wrote, "his eyes sparkled with kindness." Mackay organized a church, and members of the chief's court began attending his classes.

He took the name Apolo at his baptism in 1895 after the Apollos of the Bible. He was given the name "Kivebulaya," meaning "from Europe," because he always wore a suit under his cassock.

Apolo is remembered in the Church of England with a commemoration on 30 May.

References

Further reading

1864 births
1933 deaths
Ugandan twins
Anglican saints
Ugandan Anglican missionaries
Anglican missionaries in the Democratic Republic of the Congo
Ugandan expatriates in the Democratic Republic of the Congo
Belgian Congo people
Ugandan Anglican priests